André Filipe Eusébio Paulo (born 18 December 1996) is a Portuguese professional footballer who plays as a goalkeeper for Sporting CP.

Club career
Born in Albufeira, Algarve, Paulo spent most of his formative years in the academy of Imortal DC, finishing his youth career with Portimonense SC. He made his senior debut in the lower leagues of the Lisbon Football Association, winning the 2018–19 Campeonato de Portugal with Casa Pia A.C. and failing to achieve another promotion from that tier with Real S.C. in the following season as the league was curtailed by the COVID-19 pandemic.

Paulo signed a two-year contract with Sporting CP on 7 June 2020, being assigned to their reserves also in the third division. Third choice at the first team behind Antonio Adán and Luís Maximiano, he played his first match in the Primeira Liga on 19 May 2021 which was the last of the campaign, replacing Maximiano in the 66th minute of the 5–1 home win against C.S. Marítimo and thus being eligible for a winners' medal.

Honours
Casa Pia
Campeonato de Portugal: 2018–19

Sporting CP
Primeira Liga: 2020–21
Taça da Liga: 2020–21

References

External links
Sporting official profile

1996 births
Living people
People from Albufeira
Sportspeople from Faro District
Portuguese footballers
Association football goalkeepers
Primeira Liga players
Campeonato de Portugal (league) players
Imortal D.C. players
AD Oeiras players
Casa Pia A.C. players
Real S.C. players
Sporting CP B players
Sporting CP footballers